Anton David Jeftha (born 1986), is a South African actor, model, MC and a voice over artist. He is best known for the roles in the films Escape Room: Tournament of Champions.

Personal life
Jefta was born in 1986 in Cape Town, South Africa. He later grew up in Belhar on the Cape Flats. He graduated from University of the Western Cape with a BCom degree in finance, economics, and information systems, but later did not complete his honors degree in finance. Since 2016, he is living in the United States. He occasionally come to South Africa to visit his family in Durbanville, Western Cape. He has three sisters.

He has been speculated to be dating with rapper Boity Thulo as the two have some time been hinting some romance.

Career
In 2009, he made acting debut with the short film Pumzi. In 2012, he appeared in the American action series Strike Back as a Mossad agent in an episode "Vengeance: Part 5". In the same year, he made television debut with the M-Net television series Crimes Uncovered, and played the role of "kidnapper Zubair". Then he acted in the film Mankind: The Story of All of Us and Texas in a Bottle. In 2014, he made a supportive role in the international series Homeland and Dominion. In the modeling career, he became one of the top 14 finalists for Cosmo’s sexiest man.

In 2020 he joined with the M-Net telenovela, Legacy, by playing the role as "Sebastian Junior (SJ) Prince". In 2019, he played the role "Rhiyaaz" in the kykNET soap opera Suidooster. Apart from cinema and television, he made some appearances in theatre by performing in the plays Into The Woods (2004), Tannie Dora Foes Bos (2012) and UCB (Impov) (2017).

Filmography

References

External links
 IMDb

Living people
South African male film actors
South African male television actors
South African male stage actors
1986 births